Clanculus floridus, common name the florid clanculus, is a species of sea snail, a marine gastropod mollusk in the family Trochidae, the top snails.

Description
The height of the shell varies between 8 and 9 mm, its diameter between 11 and 12 mm. The low conical, deeply umbilicate shell is subcarinate at the periphery. The carina is evanescent toward the termination of the body whorl. Its color is light brown or grayish, striped with rich brown, the markings somewhat interrupted around the middle of the upper surface of the body whorl. The stripes are more numerous and narrower at the periphery than upon the upper surface, and continued upon the base, or fading out there, and replaced by dots of brown on a light ground. The sutures are deeply impressed. The shell contains about five whorls. The apical ones are acute, pale pink, the following closely granose-cingulate. The body whorl contains about 17 to 21 closely beaded cinguli, of which the 8th or 9th usually forms the peripheral angle, all above that being subequal and equally spaced. Those of the base are more crowded and finer ; the interstices are sharply, finely obliquely striate. The body whorl is deflected toward the aperture, and appearing gibbous. The aperture is subhorizontal, and subtetragonal.  The outer lip shows a finely plicate thickening or rib within, and a strong tubercle near the upper angle. The basal margin is expanded, crenulated, and bearing a small but distinct central, very oblique fold within. The columella is very oblique, with a strong biplicate tooth below, a wide triangular projection at the middle, the whole edge reflexed but not distinctly crenulate. The insertion is located upon the side of the rather wide umbilicus, which has a radiately crenulated marginal rib. The parietal wall is wrinkled.

Distribution
This marine species is endemic to Australia and occurs off New South Wales and Victoria

References

 Philippi, R.A. 1849. Diagnosen mehrerer neuer Trochus arten. Zeitschrift für Malakozoologie 9 6(10): 146-160
 Philippi, R.A. 1852. Trochidae. pp. 233–248 in Küster, H.C. (ed). Systematisches Conchylien-Cabinet von Martini und Chemnitz. Nürnberg : Bauer & Raspe Vol. 2.
 Adams, A. 1853. Contributions towards a monograph of the Trochidae, a family of gastropodous Mollusca. Proceedings of the Zoological Society of London 1851(19): 150-192
 Angas, G.F. 1865. On the marine molluscan fauna of the Province of South Australia, with a list of all the species known up to the present time, together with remarks on their habitats and distribution, etc. Proceedings of the Zoological Society of London 1865: 155-"180" 
 Angas, G.F. 1867. A list of species of marine Mollusca found in Port Jackson harbour, New South Wales and on the adjacent coasts, with notes on their habits etc. Proceedings of the Zoological Society of London 1867: 185-233, 912-935
 Fischer, P. 1877. Genres Calcar, Trochus, Xenophora, Tectarius et Risella. pp. 115–240 in Keiner, L.C. (ed.). Spécies general et iconographie des coquilles vivantes. Paris : J.B. Baillière Vol. 11.
 Tenison-Woods, J.E. 1879. Census; with brief descriptions of the marine shells of Tasmania and the adjacent islands. Proceedings of the Royal Society of Tasmania 1877: 26-57
 Watson, R.B. 1886. Report on the Scaphopoda and Gastropoda collected by the H.M.S. "Challenger" during the years 1873-1876. Report on the Scientific Results of the Voyage of H.M.S. Challenger 1873–1876, Zoology 15(42): 756 pp., 50 pls
 Brazier, J. 1889. Notes and critical remarks on a donation of shells sent to the Museum of the Conchological Society of Great Britain and Ireland. Journal of Conchology 6: 66-84
 Whitelegge, T. 1889. List of the Marine and Freshwater Invertebrate Fauna of Port Jackson and the Neighbourhood. Journal and Proceedings of the Royal Society of New South Wales 23: 1-161
 Henn, A.U. & Brazier, J.W. 1894. List of Mollusca found at Green Point, Watson's Bay, Sydney. With a few remarks upon some of the most interesting species and descriptions of new species. Proceedings of the Linnean Society of New South Wales 2 9: 165-182
 Hedley, C. 1918. A checklist of the marine fauna of New South Wales. Part 1. Journal and Proceedings of the Royal Society of New South Wales 51: M1-M120 
 Iredale, T. 1924. Results from Roy Bell's molluscan collections. Proceedings of the Linnean Society of New South Wales 49(3): 179-279, pl. 33-36 
 McMichael, D.F. 1960. Shells of the Australian Sea-Shore. Brisbane : Jacaranda Press pp. 1–127, 287 figs.
 Iredale, T. & McMichael, D.F. 1962. A reference list of the marine Mollusca of New South Wales. Memoirs of the Australian Museum 11: 1-109
 Macpherson, J.H. & Gabriel, C.J. 1962. Marine Molluscs of Victoria. Melbourne : Melbourne University Press & National Museum of Victoria 475 pp. 
 Wilson, B. 1993. Australian Marine Shells. Prosobranch Gastropods. Kallaroo, Western Australia : Odyssey Publishing Vol. 1 408 pp
 Jansen, P. 1995. A review of the genus Clanculus Montfort, 1810 (Gastropoda: Trochidae) in Australia, with description of a new subspecies and the introduction of a nomen novum. Vita Marina 43(1-2): 39-62

External links
 To Biodiversity Heritage Library (8 publications)
 To World Register of Marine Species
 

floridus
Gastropods described in 1850
Taxa named by Rodolfo Amando Philippi